is the fourth album by Japanese idol girl group Nogizaka46. It was released on 17 April 2019. The album reached the top position on the weekly Oricon Albums Chart, with 446,618 copies sold. It also reached number one on the Billboard Japan Hot Albums and Top Albums Sales charts.

Release 
This album was released in 4 versions: Type-A, Type-B, first press limited edition, and a regular edition.

Track listing
All lyrics written by Yasushi Akimoto.

Type-A

Type-B

First press limited edition

Regular edition

Charts

Sales

References

Nogizaka46 albums
Japanese-language albums
2019 albums